Viscount Melbourne was launched in Shields in 1835. She was the largest merchant vessel built in Shields to that time. Some London merchants experienced in the trade with India had her built expressly for the trade with China.

Viscount Melbourne was wrecked on 5 January 1842 on the Luconia Shoals, in the China Seas. All on board abandoned ship in five boats, two of which were reported missing. She was on a voyage from Singapore to Macao with a cargo of cotton, rice, and saltpetre.

Citations

1835 ships
Ships built on the River Tyne
Age of Sail merchant ships of England
Maritime incidents in January 1842